Francesco Conti (c. 1470 in Rome – 1521 in Rome) was an Italian Roman Catholic archbishop and cardinal.

Life 
The son of Jacopo Conti, signore of Carpineto (and a member of the Roman nobility); and Elisabetta Carafa della Stadera. His uncle was the Cardinal Giovanni Conti. Francesco Conti was educated in law.  

Francesco Conti was the father of six illegitimate children, five sons and one daughter; Ottavio, Stefano, Camillo, Marzio, Giovanni and Giulia.

He died on 29 June 1521 and was originally buried in San Vitale (Rome).

Career 
On 8 October 1494 he was appointed archbishop of Conza and remained in this position until his resignation on 11 September 1517.

He never visited the archdiocese, ruling through a series of vicar generals.

Pope Leo X made Conti a cardinal priest in the consistory on 1 July 1517. He received the red hat and the titular church of San Vitale on 6 July 1517 and served as Camerlengo of the Sacred College of Cardinals from 11 January 1520 to 7 January 1521.

See also
Catholic Church in Italy

References

1521 deaths
16th-century Italian cardinals
Year of birth unknown
Archbishops of Sant'Angelo dei Lombardi-Conza-Nusco-Bisaccia
15th-century Italian Roman Catholic archbishops
Francesco